West Auckland Kiwi True Blues FC is an amateur association football club based in Auckland, New Zealand. Their home ground is Brains Park located in the suburb of Kelston in Auckland, they currently compete in the NRFL Northern Conference.

West Auckland AFC and Kiwi True Blues FC, an Auckland Sunday Football Association team, merged their top teams in 2019, allowing Kiwi True Blues to play in the NRF Conference and together as one team in the Chatham Cup. Their first team coach is Scott MacKay, who won the National League with Waitakere City in 1990, 1992, 1995, 1996 and 1997.

References

External links
Club website
Kiwi True Blues Facebook page

Association football clubs in Auckland
Sport in West Auckland, New Zealand